Moghandar (also Romanized as Moghāndar; also known as Moghāmdarreh and Mūghāndar) is a village in Yeylaq Rural District, in the Central District of Buin va Miandasht County, Isfahan Province, Iran. At the 2006 census, its population was 74, in 12 families.

References 

Populated places in Buin va Miandasht County